Galagoda Aththe Gnanasara Thero is the Secretary General of Bodu Bala Sena, a Sinhalese Buddhist nationalist organisation. He was born in Galagodaaththa in the southern district of Galle.

Galagoda Aththe Gnanasara Thero was educated at Wathuravila Aranya Senasanaya in Galle, before moving to Sarananda Piriwena in Anuradhapura and Vidyodaya University in Colombo. He studied Buddhism (BA, MBA) at Kelaniya University. He worked as a principal at Kalapaluwaw Piriwena.

In June 2017, the Police Organized Crimes Prevention Division arrested Gnanasara Thero on allegations of obstructing a police officer in Welikada, following a multi-week manhunt. He was arrested after appearing at a police station to give a statement, and later released on bail.

Gnanasara Thero was convicted of being in contempt of court, but was released on 23 May 2019 after having been given a Presidential pardon.

He is currently the Chairman of Presidential Task Force.

References

Year of birth missing (living people)
Living people
Sri Lankan Buddhist monks